Gourmet is a 2008 South Korean television series starring Kim Rae-won and Nam Sang-mi. It aired on SBS from June 18 to September 9, 2008 on Mondays and Tuesdays at 21:55 for 24 episodes.

It was adapted from Sikgaek, a popular manhwa by Huh Young-man, which was first serialized in newspapers in 2002. The TV series explores the theme of cooking through the rivalry between two hansik (Korean cuisine) chefs, as one of them travels around the nation looking for the best ingredients and recipes.

Plot
Kim Rae-Won stars as the warm hearted chef-in-training Lee Sung-Chan, while actress Nam Sang-Mi plays a silly country girl, Kim Jin-soo, who trails Lee with high hopes of becoming a food columnist. Veteran actor Choi Bul-Am  appears as Master Oh Sook-soo, Lee's stepfather and the only person who truly believes in Lee's potential.

Sung-Chan is a happy and bright young man who loves to cook. Leaving the heavy responsibility of becoming the head chef of Oh's famous restaurant to his stepbrother, he explores the world of cooking and discovers that he's actually good at it. When Oh announces that he will not choose his own son to become the owner and head chef, cold-hearted jealousy and competition arise.

Cast

Main characters
Kim Rae-won as Lee Sung-chan
Noh Young-hak as teenage Sung-chan
Kang Yi-seok as young Sung-chan
Kwon Oh-joong as Oh Bong-joo
Ahn Yong-joon as teenage Bong-joo
Nam Sang-mi as Kim Jin-soo
Kim So-yeon as Yoon Joo-hee
Won Ki-joon as Gong Min-woo
Choi Bool-am as Oh Seung-geun

Supporting characters
Kang Nam-gil as Director Han (Jin-soo's boss)
Jung Jin as Ja-woon
Shim Yang-hong as Director Yoon (Joo-hee's father)
Kim Ae-kyung as Madam Jo
Lee Won-yong as Jong-goo
Lee Won-jong as Dal-pyung
Hoon Ki as Ki-jung
Kim Sun-hyuk as Sang-ki
Lee Kyung-jin as Jin-soo's mother
Choi Jae-hwan as Seok-dong
Do Yoon-joo as General manager
Kim Hye-jung as Manager Kang
Yang Taek-jo as President Seo
Kim Sung-kyum as President Jang
Lee Ki-young as Matsumoto Junichi
Jung Young-sook as Soon-boon (Seung-geun's friend)
Jo Sang-goo as legendary butcher Kang Pyun-soo
Choi Song-hyun as cooking contest MC
Jang Moon-seok as towing truck driver
Choi Jae-kwon as Sung Sik-gaek (Sung-chan's friend)
Yeo Jin-goo as Ho-tae
Kim Da-in

Episode ratings

Source: TNS Media Korea

Awards and nominations

DVD release
The television series was released on DVD in November 2008 by YA Entertainment in two-volume boxed sets. Each volume included four discs, with Korean audio and English-language subtitles.

International broadcast
It aired in the Philippines on the GMA Network beginning July 18, 2011.

It aired in Thailand on Channel 3 every Monday to Friday at 1.40 p.m. starting from August 14, 2012.

See also
Le Grand Chef - 2007 film based on the same manhwa.

References

External links 
 Gourmet official SBS website 
 
 

Seoul Broadcasting System television dramas
South Korean romance television series
South Korean cooking television series
Korean-language television shows
Television shows based on works by Huh Young-man
2008 South Korean television series debuts
2008 South Korean television series endings
Television shows written by Choi Wan-kyu
Television series by JS Pictures